Angela Jonsson (born 28 February 1990) is an Icelandic model and actress of half-Indian origin who shot to fame after she won the Kingfisher Calendar Model Hunt in 2011.

Personal life
Jonsson was born on 28 February 1990 in Chennai to a father from Iceland and a mother from Chennai. Her parents are coffee exporters. She has six sisters and three brothers, and spent her childhood in an estate on the mountains of Kodaikanal where she studied at an American international school.

Career
Jonsson modelled for the Kingfisher Calendar in 2011 after winning the calendar's Calendar Girl Hunt competition that same year. She judged the Kingfisher Calendar Girl Hunt 2012.  She has been taking Hindi diction and dance lessons to begin her career as an actress in Bollywood and other Indian film industries.

She was voted one of Times 50 Most Desirable Women in India in 2011.

References

Living people
1990 births
Icelandic female models
Icelandic film actresses
Icelandic people of Indian descent
Icelandic expatriates in India
Actresses from Chennai
Female models from Chennai
European actresses in India
Actresses of European descent in Indian films
21st-century Icelandic actresses